Ochiltree Castle may refer to:

 Ochiltree Castle, East Ayrshire, Scotland
 Ochiltree Castle, West Lothian, Scotland